Mothers & Daughters is a 2004 independent film written and directed by British duo Hannah Davis and David Conolly.

It is a story of Londoners connected by family, friends and a certain therapist who brings all her patients’ problems back to their mothers. Lives start to unravel during an eventful dinner party where the cook spoils the food, a coke-headed model flirts with a married vicar, a secret affair is exposed, old family wounds are reopened and one meddling mother drops by to cause even more trouble.

Plot
Lives start to unravel during an eventful dinner party when the group are forced to face their issues head on. For one couple, vicar Dan (David Conolly) and his wife Emma (Joanna Pecover) are faced with the revelation that one of them has been having an affair with the evening’s hostess Kate (Miranda Hart). Worst of all she has to in turn face her mother (Joan Blackham) who drops in to “help out”.

Even the therapist (Alix Longman) has to face her own maternal misgivings as she returns home to deal with the aftermath of her own mother’s descent into Alzheimer’s. Nina (Caroline Burns Cooke) explores having to care for a sick mother who, when she was well, appeared not to care for either Nina or her sister.

Cast
Joan Blackham as Paddy a mother who just can’t help but meddle
Jean Boht as Mary a mother in a bit of a muddle
Hannah Davis as Dolly a daughter with schemes and dreams
Miranda Hart as Kate a daughter with a secret she longs to share
Simone Bowkett as Sam a daughter with an addiction
Alix Longman as Lorraine the therapist who brings everything down to the mother
Caroline Burns Cooke as Nina a daughter who cares for her mother
Joanna Pecover as Emma a daughter lost in motherhood
David Conolly as Dan a vicar with a wife, a daughter and one hell of a surprise on the way
Emma Stirland as Ari a daughter… with her mothers boyfriend

Production
David Conolly was in a show on London’s West End that seemed to close on the first day of rehearsal. Conolly’s unexpected unemployment meant a new ear to listen to the stories and a new eye for the structure of the screenplay.

Eight actors were chosen for the film (including Hannah Davis's mother Jean Boht) and six months were spent devising and rehearsing the script. This was followed by intense periods of filming with breaks so that the cast and crew could earn money to keep them going also giving time for Conolly and Davis to earn enough to finance the next phase of production. Producer and best-selling novelist Lynda La Plante (of Prime Suspect, Trial & Retribution and Commander fame) saw a teaser for the movie and offered to become part of the post-production team and sign on as executive producer.

References

External links
 MothersAndDaughtersMovie.com

2004 films
British drama films
British independent films
2000s English-language films
2000s British films
Films scored by Carl Davis